Macedonia (officially under the provisional appellation "former Yugoslav Republic of Macedonia", abbreviated "FYR Macedonia") participated in the Eurovision Song Contest 2004 with the song "Life" written by Jovan Jovanov and Ilija Nikolovski. The song was performed by Toše Proeski, who was internally selected by the Macedonian broadcaster Macedonian Radio Television (MRT) to compete for Macedonia at the 2004 contest in Istanbul, Turkey. MRT returned to the Eurovision Song Contest after a one-year absence following their relegation from 2003 as one of the bottom five countries in the 2002 contest. Toše Proeski's appointment as the Macedonian representative was announced on 7 June 2003, while MRT organised Skopje Fest 2004 in order to select his song. Eight songs competed in the competition on 14 February 2004 where "Angel si ti" was selected following the combination of votes from an eleven-member jury panel, Proeski himself and a public televote. The song was later translated from Macedonian to English for the Eurovision Song Contest and was titled "Life".

Macedonia competed in the semi-final of the Eurovision Song Contest which took place on 12 May 2004. Performing during the show in position 15, "Life" was announced among the top 10 entries of the semi-final and therefore qualified to compete in the final on 15 May. It was later revealed that Macedonia placed tenth out of the 22 participating countries in the semi-final with 71 points. In the final, Macedonia performed in position 15 and placed fourteenth out of the 24 participating countries, scoring 47 points.

Background

The nation's best result in the contest to this point was fifteenth, which it achieved in 2000 with the song "100% te ljubam" performed by XXL. The Macedonian national broadcaster, Macedonian Radio Television (MRT), broadcasts the event within Macedonia and organises the selection process for the nation's entry. Macedonia had previously selected all of their entries for the Eurovision Song Contest by using the national final Skopje Fest. MRT confirmed their intentions to participate at the 2004 Eurovision Song Contest on 7 July 2003. For 2004, the broadcaster opted to internally select the Macedonian artist with the song selected through Skopje Fest.

Before Eurovision

Artist selection 

On 7 July 2003, MRT announced during a press conference at the Holiday Inn Hotel in Skopje that they had internally selected Toše Proeski to represent Macedonia in Istanbul. Proeski previously attempted to represent Macedonia at the Eurovision Song Contest by competing in the country's national final selections on several occasions: in 1998 with the song "Ostani do kraj" which he performed with the group Megatim Plus and placed eighth, and in 2000 with the song "Solzi pravat zlaten prsten" which placed third. It was also announced that the Skopje Fest 2004 song contest would be organised to select the song Toše Proeski would perform.

Skopje Fest 2004 
A submission period was opened for interested composers to submit their songs until 15 October 2003. MRT received 60 submissions at the closing of the deadline and eight songs were selected by Toše Proeski and his manager Liliana Petrović together with a ten-member committee consisting of Mihail Rendžov (poet), Jana Andreevska (composer), Radica Mitić (MR 2), Svetlana Marković (sound designer), Ivan Mirčevski (MTV), Arben Shaqiri (singer), Danail Darkovski (composer and instrumentalist), John Ilija Apelgren (singer), Ariton Krliu (MR 2) and Ilija Pejovski (composer and conductor). The eight competing songs were announced on 9 January 2004 and later appeared on Proeski's forthcoming album Den za nas. English versions of the eight songs were also recorded along with six of the songs in Serbian which appeared on the Serbian version of the album Dan za nas.

Skopje Fest 2004 took place on 14 January 2004 at the Universal Hall in Skopje, hosted by Karolina Petkovska and Aneta Andonova and was broadcast on MTV 1 and MTV Sat. All eight competing songs were performed by Toše Proeski and "Angel si ti" was selected as the winning song by a combination of public televoting (1/3), votes from Proeski himself (1/3) and an eleven-member jury panel (1/3). The jury panel consisted of Srgjan Kerim (Media Print Makedonija), Esma Redžepova (singer-songwriter), Aleksandar Džambazov (composer), Bubo Karov (K-15), Ariton Krliu (MR 2), Dario (singer), Iskra Trpeva (singer), Aleksandar Masevski (composer and producer), Oliver Belopeta (artistic director), Sašo Čolakovski (journalist) and Ivan Mirčevski (MTV). The English versions of the eight songs were also presented to the public through 40-second samples after each song was performed. In addition to the performances of the competing songs, the competition featured a guest performance by Synthesis.

At Eurovision

It was announced that the competition's format would be expanded to include a semi-final in 2004. According to the rules, all nations with the exceptions of the host country, the "Big Four" (France, Germany, Spain and the United Kingdom), and the ten highest placed finishers in the 2003 contest are required to qualify from the semi-final on 12 May 2004 in order to compete for the final on 15 May 2004; the top ten countries from the semi-final progress to the final. On 23 March 2004, a special allocation draw was held which determined the running order for the semi-final and Macedonia was set to perform in position 15, following the entry from Cyprus and before the entry from Slovenia. Toše Proeski performed the English version of "Angel si ti" at the contest, titled "Life" (formerly "Life Is..."). Among the backing performers that joined Proeski on stage for the Macedonian performance was Tamara Todevska who would go on to represent Macedonia in the Eurovision Song Contest 2008 and 2019.

At the end of the semi-final, Macedonia was announced as having finished in the top 10 and consequently qualifying for the grand final. It was later revealed that Macedonia placed tenth in the semi-final, receiving a total of 71 points. The draw for the running order for the final was done by the presenters during the announcement of the ten qualifying countries during the semi-final and Macedonia was drawn to perform in position 15, following the entry from Russia and before the entry from Greece. Macedonia placed fourteenth in the final, scoring 47 points.

The semi-final and final were broadcast in Macedonia on MTV 1 and MTV Sat with commentary by Milanka Rašić. The Macedonian spokesperson, who announced the Macedonian votes during the final, was Karolina Petkovska.

Voting 
Below is a breakdown of points awarded to Macedonia and awarded by Macedonia in the semi-final and grand final of the contest. The nation awarded its 12 points to Albania in the semi-final and the final of the contest.

Points awarded to Macedonia

Points awarded by Macedonia

References

2004
Countries in the Eurovision Song Contest 2004
Eurovision